Brendan P. Crighton is a member of the Massachusetts Senate. He was sworn into office on March 7, 2018. A resident of Lynn, Massachusetts, he was elected as a Democrat to represent the 3rd Essex senate district. Crighton is a former member of the Massachusetts House of Representatives and Lynn city councillor.

He is the only candidate in the 2018 special election to succeed Thomas McGee, who resigned as State Senator for the Third Essex District. He was elected to the Senate on March 6, 2018.

See also
 2019–2020 Massachusetts legislature
 2021–2022 Massachusetts legislature

References

Democratic Party Massachusetts state senators
Living people
Lynn, Massachusetts City Council members
21st-century American politicians
Year of birth missing (living people)